Kalabha Mazha is a 2011 Malayalam film directed by P Sukumenon, starring Krisha and Radhika in the lead roles.

Synopsis
Kalabha Mazha tells the friendly relationship between a Hindu and a Muslim family. Madhava Menon who worked in the All India Radio always respects other religions and works for the upliftment of  the society. Malavika is the eldest daughter of Madhava Menon. She is betrothed to Unnikrishnan. She is more than a sister to her two younger siblings, since their mother had died when they were quite young. Menon, is regretful that he hasn't been able to save much money for his children, and the family finds it hard, to make both ends meet, as days pass by. There is a Muslim family staying nearby, headed by Kunjali. His son-in-law, on a job in the Middle East, had been missing for about six long years. Malavika's sister, falls for a film director, and soon realizes that her decision was wrong. Her brother on the other hand, takes up a job at a local bank, and finds himself having transformed into a goon. Later, Malavika bumps into her sister's absconding lover, and almost meets with the same fate in his hands.

Cast
 Krishna as Unnikrishnan
 Devika Nambiar as Malavika
 Thilakan as Madhava Menon
 Mamukkoya as Kunjali
 Cochin Haneefa
 Jagathy Sreekumar as Vilwadiri Iyyer
 Indrans
 Saina Krishna
 Kalaranjini as Kamashi
 Sarat
 Mohan Kartha
 Hanna Yazir
 Baby Gandhika

References

 Nowrunning article
 OneIndia article
 OneIndia report

2010s Malayalam-language films
2010s romantic musical films
Indian romantic musical films